In the Calendar of the Church in Wales, each holy and saint’s day listed has been assigned a number which indicates its category. Commemorations not included in this Calendar may be observed with the approval of the bishop.

Category 1 
 The First Sunday of Advent: 27 November – 3 December
 The Second Sunday of Advent: 4–10 December
 The Third Sunday of Advent: 11–17 December
 The Fourth Sunday of Advent: 18–24 December
 Christmas Day: 25 December
 The (First) Sunday of Christmas: 26–31 December
 The Epiphany of our Lord: 6 January
 The Presentation of Christ: 2 February
 The Second Sunday before Lent, Creation Sunday
 The Sunday before Lent, Transfiguration Sunday
 Ash Wednesday
 The First Sunday of Lent (Invocabit)
 The Second Sunday of Lent (Reminiscere)
 The Third Sunday of Lent (Oculi)
 The Fourth Sunday of Lent, Mothering Sunday
 The Fifth Sunday of Lent, Passion Sunday
 The Sixth Sunday of Lent, Palm Sunday
 Monday, Tuesday and Wednesday of Holy Week
 Maundy Thursday
 Good Friday
 Easter Eve
 Easter Day
 Monday to Saturday of Easter Week
 The Second Sunday of Easter
 The Third Sunday of Easter
 The Fourth Sunday of Easter
 The Fifth Sunday of Easter
 The Sixth Sunday of Easter, Rogation Sunday
 The Ascension of our Lord: Thursday
 The Day of Pentecost
 Trinity Sunday
 The Last Sunday after Pentecost, Bible Sunday: 23–29 October
 All Saints’ Day: 1 November
 The First Sunday of the Kingdom: 30 October – 5 November
 The Second Sunday of the Kingdom: 6–12 November
 The Third Sunday of the Kingdom: 13–19 November
 The Fourth Sunday of the Kingdom, Christ the King: 20–26 November

Category 2 
 Christmas Eve: 24 December
 The Second Sunday of Christmas: 2–5 January (The Epiphany may be celebrated on this Sunday)
 The First (Second) Sunday of Epiphany, The Baptism of Christ: 7–13 January

Category 3 
 The Second (Third) Sunday of Epiphany: 14–20 January
 The Third (Fourth) Sunday of Epiphany: 21–27 January
 The Fourth Sunday of Epiphany: 28 January – 1 February
 The Fifth Sunday before Lent
 The Fourth Sunday before Lent
 The Third Sunday before Lent
 Eastertide: Thanksgiving for Holy Baptism
 The Second to Twenty second Sundays after Pentecost

Category 4 
 Rogation Days: Monday, Tuesday and Wednesday
 Thursday: Thanksgiving for the Holy Communion

Calendar

January 
 1 The Naming of Jesus
 3 Morris Williams (1874), Priest and Poet
 6 The Epiphany of our Lord
 10 William Laud (1645), Bishop
 11 Rhys Prichard (1644), Priest and Poet
 11 William Williams (1791), Deacon and Poet
 11 Isaac Williams (1865), Priest and Poet
 13 Hilary (368), Bishop
 14 Kentigern (c 603), Bishop
 17 Antony (356), Abbot
 18 The Confession of Peter, Apostle
 21 Agnes (304), Virgin and Martyr
 23 Francis de Sales (1622), Bishop
 24 Cadoc (6th century), Abbot
 25 The Conversion of Paul, Apostle
 26 Timothy and Titus, Companions of Paul
 27 John Chrysostom (407), Bishop and Doctor
 28 Thomas Aquinas (1274), Doctor

February 
 1 Bride or Bridget (6th century), Abbess
 2 The Presentation of Christ in the Temple (Candlemas)
 3 The Saints, Martyrs and Missionaries of Europe
 3 Seiriol (6th century), Abbot
 4 Manche Masemola (1928), Martyr
 9 Teilo (6th century), Bishop
 14 Cyril (869), Monk and Missionary
 14 Methodius (885), Bishop and Missionary
 18 John of Fiesole (Fra Angelico) (1455), Priest, Religious and Painter
 18 Andrei Rublev (c 1430), Religious, Painter
 19 Thomas Burgess (1837), Bishop and Teacher of the Faith
 20 The Saints, Martyrs and Missionaries of Africa
 23 Polycarp (c 155), Bishop and Martyr
 24 Matthias, Apostle
 27 George Herbert (1633), Priest, and all Pastors

Ember Days: Wednesday, Friday and Saturday following Lent I

March 
 1 David (6th century), Bishop, Patron Saint of Wales
 2 Chad, Bishop (672)
 5 Non (5th century), Mother of David of Wales
 7 Perpetua, Felicity and their Companions (203), Martyrs
 9 Gregory of Nyssa, Bishop (395)
 12 Gregory the Great (604), Bishop and Doctor
 17 Patrick (5th century), Bishop, Patron Saint of Ireland
 18 Cyril of Jerusalem (386), Bishop
 19 Joseph of Nazareth
 20 Cuthbert, Bishop (687)
 21 Thomas Cranmer (1556), Bishop, Teacher of the Faith and Martyr
 21 Hugh Latimer, Nicholas Ridley, and Robert Ferrar (1555), Bishops, Teachers of the Faith and Martyrs
 24 Oscar Romero (1980), Bishop and Martyr
 25 The Annunciation of our Lord to the Blessed Virgin Mary
 29 Woolos (6th century), King
 30 John Keble, Priest and Teacher (1886)
 31 John Donne, Priest and Poet (1631)

Eastertide: Thanksgiving for Holy Baptism

April 
 3 Richard, Bishop (1253)
 7 Brynach (5th century), Abbot
 8 Griffith Jones (1761), Priest and Teacher of the Faith
 9 Saints, Martyrs and Missionaries of South America
 9 Dietrich Bonhoeffer (1945), Pastor, Teacher of the Faith and Martyr
 11 George Augustus Selwyn (1878), Bishop and Missionary
 15 Padarn (6th century), Bishop
 20 Beuno (c 640), Abbot
 21 Anselm (1109), Bishop and Doctor
 23 George (304?), Martyr, Patron Saint of England
 25 Mark, Evangelist
 29 Catherine of Siena (1380), Writer

Ember Days: Wednesday, Friday and Saturday following Pentecost

Thursday after Trinity Sunday: Thanksgiving for the Holy Communion

May 
 1 Philip and James, Apostles
 2 Athanasius (373), Bishop and Doctor
 3 Henry Vaughan (1695), Poet
 4 Monica (378)
 5 Asaph (6th century), Bishop
 8 Julian of Norwich (c 1417)
 9 Gregory of Nazianzus (390), Bishop
 14 Matthias, Apostle
 15 Edmwnd Prys (1624), Priest, Poet and Translator
 15 John Davies (1644), Priest and Translator
 19 Dunstan (988), Bishop
 20 Chad (672), Bishop
 24 Charles Wesley (1788) and John Wesley (1791), Priests and Missionaries
 25 Julian of Norwich (c 1417)
 25 Bede (735), Doctor
 26 Augustine of Canterbury (605), Bishop
 27 The Venerable Bede, Doctor (735)
 28 Melangell (6th century), Abbess
 31 The Visit of the Virgin Mary to Elizabeth

Ember Days: Wednesday, Friday & Saturday following Pentecost

June 
 1 Justin (c 165), Apologist and Martyr
 1 Euddogwy, Bishop (6th century)
 2 Blandina and her Companions (177), Martyrs
 3 James Hannington (1885), Bishop, Missionary and Martyr
 3 Martyrs of Uganda (1886)
 3 Janani Luwum, (1977), Bishop and Martyr
 5 Boniface (754), Bishop, Missionary and Martyr
 9 Columba (597), Abbot
 10 Ephrem the Syrian (373), Deacon, Hymnwriter and Teacher of the Faith
 11 Barnabas, Apostle
 14 Basil the Great (397), Bishop and Doctor
 16 Richard (1253), Bishop
 20 Alban (250), Martyr
 20 Julius and Aaron (304–5), Martyrs
 24 The Nativity of John the Baptist
 28 Irenaeus (c 200), Bishop and Doctor
 29 Peter, Apostle
 29 Peter and Paul, Apostles
 30 The Martyrdom of Paul, Apostle

July 
 1 Euddogwy (6th century), Bishop
 2 The Visitation of the Blessed Virgin Mary
 3 Thomas, Apostle
 4 Peblig (4th century), Abbot
 6 Thomas More (1535), Martyr
 11 Benedict (c 540), Abbot
 14 John Keble (1886), Priest and Teacher of the Faith
 18 Elizabeth of Russia (1918), Religious and Martyr
 19 Gregory of Nyssa (c 394), Bishop, Teachers of the Faith
 19 Macrina (c 379), Virgin, Teacher of the Faith
 21 Howell Harris (1773), Preacher
 22 Mary Magdalene
 23 Bridget of Sweden (1373), Abbess
 25 James, Apostle
 26 Anne, Mother of the Virgin Mary
 26 Anne and Joachim Parents of the Blessed Virgin Mary
 27 Martha and Mary of Bethany
 27 Martha, Mary and Lazarus of Bethany
 28 Samson (5th century), Bishop of Dôl
 29 William Wilberforce (1833), Josephine Butler (1906) and all Social Reformers
 30 Silas, Missionary
 31 Joseph of Arimathea
 31 Ignatius of Loyola (1556), founder of the Society of Jesus

August 
 3 Germanus of Auxerre (5th century), Bishop
 5 Oswald (642), King and Martyr
 6 The Transfiguration of our Lord
 7 Mary Sumner (1921)
 8 Dominic of Toulouse (1221), Abbot and Preacher
 9 Augustine Baker (1641), Priest and Religious
 9 Mary Sumner (1921), Founder of the Mothers’ Union
 9 Edith Stein (1942), Teacher of the Faith, Religious and Martyr
 10 Lawrence (258), Deacon and Martyr
 11 Clare of Assisi (1253), Abbess, Founder of the Minoresses (Poor Clares) and Mendicant
 12 Ann Griffiths (1805), Poet
 13 Jeremy Taylor (1667), Bishop
 14 Maximilian Kolbe (1941), Priest and Martyr
 15 Mary, Mother of our Lord
 20 Bernard (1153), Abbot
 23 Tydfil (430), Martyr
 24 Bartholomew, Apostle
 25 Timothy and Titus
 27 Monica (378), Mother of Augustine of Hippo
 28 Augustine of Hippo (430), Bishop and Doctor
 29 The Beheading of John the Baptist
 31 Aidan (651), Bishop

September 
 2 Lucian Tapiedi (1942), Missionary and Martyr
 2 Martyrs of Papua New Guinea (1901 & 1942)
 3 Gregory the Great (604), Bishop and Doctor
 4 Cuthbert (687), Bishop
 8 The Nativity of the Blessed Virgin Mary
 10 William Salesbury (1584), Translator
 10 William Morgan (1604), Bishop and Translator
 11 Deiniol (6th century), Bishop
 13 Cyprian (258), Bishop, Doctor and Martyr
 14 Holy Cross
 16 Ninian (c 430), Bishop
 20 Saints, Martyrs and Missionaries of Australasia & the Pacific
 21 Matthew, Apostle and Evangelist
 25 Sergei of Radonezh (1392), Abbot
 25 Cadoc (6th century), Abbot
 26 Lancelot Andrewes (1626), Bishop
 27 Vincent de Paul (1660), Priest
 29 Michael and All Angels
 30 Jerome (420), Doctor

Ember Days: Wednesday, Friday & Saturday following 14 September

October 
 4 Francis of Assisi (1226), Friar
 6 William Tyndale (1536), Translator and Martyr
 9 Cynog (5th century), Abbot
 13 Edward the Confessor (1066), King
 14 Esther John (1960), Missionary and Martyr
 15 Teresa of Avila (1582), Teacher of the Faith
 16 Daniel Rowland (1790), Priest and Preacher
 17 Ignatius (c 117), Bishop and Martyr
 18 Luke, Evangelist
 19 Henry Martyn (1812), Pastor, Translator and Missionary
 23 James of Jerusalem, Bishop
 25 Lewis Bayley (1631), Bishop and Writer
 26 Alfred (899), King
 28 Simon and Jude, Apostles
 30 Richard Hooker (1600), Priest and Teacher of the Faith
 31 Vigil of All Saints
 31 Catholic and Protestant Saints and Martyrs of the Reformation Era

November 
 1 All Saints
 2 The Commemoration of All Souls
 3 The Martyrs and Confessors of our Time
 3 Winifred (7th century), Abbess
 4 The Saints and Martyrs of the Anglican Communion
 5 Cybi (6th century), Abbot
 6 Illtud (5th century), Abbot
 7 Richard Davies (1581), Bishop and Translator
 8 The Saints of Wales
 10 Leo (461), Bishop and Doctor
 11 Martin of Tours (c 397), Bishop
 12 Tysilio (6th century), Abbot
 13 Charles Simeon (1836), Priest and Teacher of the Faith
 14 Dyfrig (5th – 6th century), Bishop
 15 The Saints, Martyrs and Missionaries of North America
 16 Margaret of Scotland (c. 1045 – 1093), Queen
 17 Hugh (1200), Bishop
 18 Hilda (680), Abbess
 19 Elizabeth of Hungary (1231), Princess
 21 Paulinus (5th century), Abbot
 22 Cecilia (230), Martyr
 23 Clement (c 100), Bishop
 25 John Donne (1631), Priest and Poet
 29 Vigil and Day of Intercession for the Mission of the Church
 30 Andrew, Apostle, Patron Saint of Scotland

December 
 1 Nicholas Ferrar (1637), Deacon
 2 The Saints, Martyrs and Missionaries of Asia
 3 Francis Xavier (1552), Missionary
 6 Nicholas (c 342), Bishop
 7 Ambrose (397), Bishop and Doctor
 8 Cynidr (6th century), Bishop
 13 Lucy (304), Martyr
 14 John of the Cross (1591), Priest, Poet and Teacher of the Faith
 17 O Wisdom!
 18 O Adonai!
 19 O Root of Jesse!
 20 O Key of David!
 21 O Dayspring!
 21 Thomas, Apostle
 22 O King of the nations!
 23 O Emmanuel!
 24 Vigil
 25 Nativity of the Lord: Christmas Day
 26 Stephen, Deacon and First Martyr
 27 John, Apostle and Evangelist
 28 The Innocents
 29 Thomas of Canterbury (1170), Bishop and Martyr
 30 Tathan (6th century), Abbot
 31 John Wycliffe (1384), Priest and Translator

Ember Days: Wednesday, Friday & Saturday following 13 December

See also 

 Calendar of saints
 Calendar of saints (Church of England)
 General Roman Calendar

References

External links 
 THE NEW CALENDAR AND THE COLLECTS
 The Alternative Calendar and Lectionary of the Church in Wales
 Lectionary 2019 – 2020
 Order for the Holy Eucharist 2004
 The Book of Common Prayer 1984 Volume I

Wales
Church in Wales